Ørsta Idrettslag is a sports club in Ørsta, Møre og Romsdal, Norway. It has sections for alpine skiing, association football, track and field, team handball, and cross-country skiing.

As of the 2019 season, the men's football team was playing in 4. divisjon, the fifth-tier in the Norwegian football league system. It last played in the fourth-tier 3. divisjon in the 2007 season, and in the third-tier 2. divisjon in the 2000 season.

References

External links
 Official site 

Football clubs in Norway
Sport in Møre og Romsdal
Association football clubs established in 1928
Athletics clubs in Norway
1928 establishments in Norway